Mekelle University is a higher education and training public institution located in Mekelle, Tigray Region, Ethiopia, 783 kilometers north of Ethiopia's capital, Addis Ababa. Mekelle University is one of the largest public universities in Ethiopia. It has seven colleges, eight institutes, and more than 90 undergraduate and 70 postgraduate programs. The student intake capacity of Mekelle University has reached 31,000 or 10% of Mekelle's population.

History

The Arid Zone Agricultural College was established at the University of Asmara, but was then moved to Agarfa in southern Ethiopia in 1990. In 1993, the Arid Zone Agricultural College was moved to Mekelle and started with 42 students in 3 degree programs. After two years, the Faculty of Science and Technology was established at the same campus and, together, these two faculties were then combined into Mekelle University College. Also, a Faculty of Law started its operation by accepting diploma students through a continuing education program.

In May 2000, the Government of Ethiopia (Council of Ministers, Regulations No. 61/1999 of Article 3) formalized Mekelle University as an autonomous higher education institution. Professor Mitiku Haile became the first president.

The univerrsity has been closed during 2021 and 2022 due to the civil war.

Academics

Presidents 
 Professor Mitiku Haile (2000-2010)
 Professor Joachim Herzig (2010-2013)
 Professor Kindeya Gebrehiwot (2013-2020) 
 Professor Fetien Abay (2020-2021)
 Dr. Fana Hagos Birhane (2021-ongoing)

Colleges 

College of Dryland Agriculture and Natural Resources Management
College of Natural and Computational Sciences
College of Law and Governance
College of Social Sciences and Languages
College of Business and Economics
College of Health Sciences and Ayder Referral Hospital
College of Veterinary Science

Institutes 

Ethiopian Institute of Technology - Mekelle (EiT-M)
Institute of Paleo-Environment and Heritage Conservation
Institute of Geo-Information and Earth Observation
Institute of Environment, Gender, and Development Studies
Institute of Water and Environment
Institute of Climate and Society 
Institute of Pedagogical Sciences
Institute of Energy (IoE)
Mekelle Institute of Technology (MIT-MU)
Sports Science Academy and Mekelle Stadium (under construction)
Ethiopian mechanical engineering society (under construction)

Development  of the main campus 
A village existed at the edge of the escarpment overlooking Mekelle. On a nearby hill, the Iyesus church was established. The villagers fetched their water from the May Anishti spring underneath. In 1895, a fort was established on the small hill overlooking the campus, and the place served as a military stronghold, that was conquered by the Italian army in 1935. 
In 1938, there was a shop-restaurant, a post, telephone and telegraph office, an Italian military post and a military cemetery.
In 1938, the village of Inda Iyesus counted approximately 350 inhabitants (including 45 Italians).
After the Italian defeat in 1941, the place was taken over by the Ethiopian army, who expanded it into a large military camp.
After the defeat of the Derg army in 1989, the place was used for a few years by the TPLF army after which it was transferred to the Ministry of Education for the establishment of the "Arid Zone College" that would gradually grow into Mekelle University.
Popular names of the campus are taken from this history: Arid Campus and Inda Iyesus Campus.

Parks 

Mekelle University main campus hosts several parks:
 Momona Park, called after a large momona tree (Faidherbia albida) under which the first lectures were organised in the academic year 1993-1994
 Belgium Park, in reference to the longstanding cooperation with the Belgian academic institutions (starting 1994)
 The large May Anishti forest on the slope between campus and city.

Notable people 

 Samuel Urkato, Minister of Science and Higher Education.

References

Mekelle University
Mekelle
Educational institutions established in 1991
1991 establishments in Ethiopia
Universities and colleges in Ethiopia